The Bensen B-10 Propcopter was an unconventional VTOL aircraft developed by Igor Bensen in the United States in the late 1950s. The pilot sat astride a beam that had an engine mounted at either end of it, each driving a rotor to provide lift. Each of these rotors was surrounded by a system of four pivotable vanes to direct its downwash, and linked to a control stick for the pilot, this provided control of the craft. Only a single prototype (registered N56U) was built.

Specifications

See also

References
1000aircraftphotos.com B-10 Prop-Copter VTOL aircraft

 
 

1950s United States experimental aircraft
VTOL aircraft
B-10
Aircraft first flown in 1958